Lake Dunlap is a census-designated place in Guadalupe County, Texas, United States. The population was 1,934 at the 2010 census. It is part of the San Antonio–New Braunfels metropolitan area.

The community is named after the former Lake Dunlap, a small reservoir on the Guadalupe River that ceased to exist in 2019.

Geography
Lake Dunlap is located along Farm to Market Road 725 in northwestern Guadalupe County, approximately eight miles northwest of Seguin. The city of New Braunfels borders Lake Dunlap to the north and west.

History 
Residential development of the lakeside community dates back to the 1970s. The population has steadily increased from around 200 in 1980, to 500 in 1990, 1,000 in 2000, and 1,934 in 2010.

Demographics
At the 2010 United States Census there were 1,934 people, 684 households, and 501 families residing in the CDP. The racial makeup of the CDP was 87.3% White (62.7% Non-Hispanic White), 1.1% Native American, 2.1% African American, 0.1% Asian, 6.4% from other races, and 2.2% from two or more races. Hispanic or Latino of any race were 34.2% of the population.

Education
The New Braunfels Independent School District (NBISD) serves students living in Lake Dunlap. Zoned campuses include Klein Road Elementary School (grades PK-5), New Braunfels Middle School (grades 6-8), New Braunfels High School Ninth Grade Center (grade 9), and New Braunfels High School  (grades 10-12).

References

Census-designated places in Guadalupe County, Texas
Census-designated places in Texas
Greater San Antonio
Populated places on the Guadalupe River (Texas)